

Events

Pre-1600
54 – Roman emperor Claudius dies from poisoning under mysterious circumstances. He is succeeded by his adoptive son Nero, rather than by Britannicus, his son with Messalina.
 409 – Vandals and Alans cross the Pyrenees and appear in Hispania.
1269 – The present church building at Westminster Abbey is consecrated.
1307 – Hundreds of the Knights Templar in France are arrested at dawn by King Philip the Fair, and later confess under torture to heresy.
1332 – Rinchinbal Khan becomes the Khagan of the Mongols and Emperor of the Yuan dynasty, reigning for only 53 days.
1399 – Coronation of Henry IV of England at Westminster Abbey.

1601–1900
1644 – A Swedish–Dutch fleet defeats the Danish fleet at Fehmarn and captures about 1,000 prisoners.
1710 – Port Royal, the capital of French Acadia, falls in a siege by British forces.
1775 – The Continental Congress establishes the Continental Navy (predecessor of the United States Navy).
1792 – In Washington, D.C., the cornerstone of the United States Executive Mansion (known as the White House since 1818) is laid.
1793 – French Revolutionary Wars: Austro-Prussian victory over Republican France at the First Battle of Wissembourg.
1812 – War of 1812: Sir Isaac Brock's British and native forces repel an invasion of Canada by General Rensselaer's United States forces.
1821 – The Declaration of Independence of the Mexican Empire is publicly proclaimed.
1843 – In New York City, B'nai B'rith, the oldest Jewish service organization in the world, is founded.
1881 – First known conversation in modern Hebrew by Eliezer Ben-Yehuda and friends.
1885 – The Georgia Institute of Technology is founded in Atlanta, Georgia. 
1892 – Edward Emerson Barnard discovers first comet discovered by photographic means.

1901–present
1903 – The Boston Red Sox win the first modern World Series, defeating the Pittsburgh Pirates in the eighth game.
1908 – Margaret Travers Symons bursts into the UK parliament and becomes the first woman to speak there.
1911 – Prince Arthur, Duke of Connaught and Strathearn, becomes the first Governor General of Canada of royal descent.
1915 – First World War: The Battle of the Hohenzollern Redoubt marks the end of the Battle of Loos.
1917 – The "Miracle of the Sun" is witnessed by an estimated 70,000 people in the Cova da Iria in Portugal.
1921 – Soviet republics sign the Treaty of Kars to formalize the borders between Turkey and the South Caucasus states.
1923 – Ankara becomes the capital of Turkey.
1943 – World War II: Marshal Pietro Badoglio announces that Italy has officially declared war on Germany.
1944 – World War II: The Soviet Riga Offensive captures the city.
1946 – France adopts the constitution of the Fourth Republic.
1962 – The Pacific Northwest experiences a cyclone the equal of a Category 3 hurricane, with winds above 150 mph. Forty-six people die.
1972 – Aeroflot Flight 217 crashes outside Moscow, killing 174.
  1972   – Uruguayan Air Force Flight 571 crashes in the Andes mountains. Twenty-eight survive the crash. All but 16 succumb before rescue on December 23.
1976 – The first electron micrograph of an Ebola virus is taken at the Centers for Disease Control and Prevention by Dr. F. A. Murphy. 
1977 – Hijacking of Lufthansa Flight 181 by the Popular Front for the Liberation of Palestine.
1983 – Ameritech Mobile Communications launches the first US cellular network in Chicago.
1990 – Syrian forces attack free areas of Lebanon, removing General Michel Aoun from the presidential palace.
1993 – At least 60 people die in eastern Papua New Guinea when a series of earthquakes rock the Finisterre Range, triggering massive landslides.
2010 – The mining accident in Copiapó, Chile ends as all 33 trapped miners arrive at the surface after a record 69 days underground.
2013 – A stampede occurs in India during the Hindu festival Navratri, killing 115 and injuring more than 110.
2016 – The Maldives announces its decision to withdraw from the Commonwealth of Nations.
2019 – Kenyan Brigid Kosgei sets a new world record for a woman runner with a time of 2:14:04 at the 2019 Chicago Marathon.

Births

Pre-1600
 467 – Emperor Xiaowen of Northern Wei, emperor of Northern Wei (d. 499)
1381 – Thomas FitzAlan, 12th Earl of Arundel, English politician, Lord High Treasurer of England (d. 1415)
1453 – Edward of Westminster, Prince of Wales, son and heir of Henry VI of England (d. 1471)
1474 – Mariotto Albertinelli, Italian painter and educator (d. 1515)
1499 – Claude of France (d. 1524)
1563 – Francis Caracciolo, Italian Catholic priest (d. 1608)
1566 – Richard Boyle, 1st Earl of Cork, Irish politician, Lord High Treasurer of Ireland (d. 1643)

1601–1900
1613 – Luisa de Guzmán, Spanish-Portuguese wife of John IV of Portugal (d. 1666)
1696 – John Hervey, 2nd Baron Hervey, English courtier and politician, Lord Privy Seal (d. 1743)
1703 – Andrea Belli, Maltese architect and businessman (d. 1772)
1713 – Allan Ramsay, Scottish-English painter (d. 1784)
1756 – James Gambier, 1st Baron Gambier, English admiral and politician, 36th Commodore Governor of Newfoundland (d. 1833)
1768 – Jacques Félix Emmanuel Hamelin, French admiral and explorer (d. 1839)
1820 – John William Dawson, Canadian geologist and academic (d. 1899)
1821 – Rudolf Virchow, German physician, biologist, and politician (d. 1902)
1825 – Charles Frederick Worth, English fashion designer, founded House of Worth (d. 1895)
1844 – Ernest Myers, English poet and author (d. 1921)
1853 – Lillie Langtry, English actress and singer (d. 1929)
1862 – Mary Kingsley, English explorer and author (d. 1900)
1870 – Albert Jay Nock, American theorist, author, and critic (d. 1945)
1872 – Leon Leonwood Bean, American hunter, businessman, and author, founded L.L.Bean (d. 1967)
1873 – Georgios Kafantaris, Greek politician and Prime Minister of Greece (d. 1946)
1874 – József Klekl, Slovene-Hungarian priest and politician (d. 1948)
1876 – Rube Waddell, American baseball player (d. 1914)
1878 – Patrick Joseph Hartigan, Australian priest and author (d. 1952)
1879 – Edward Hennig, American gymnast (d. 1960)
1880 – Sasha Chorny, Russian poet and author (d. 1932)
1887 – Jozef Tiso, Slovak priest and politician, President of Slovakia (d. 1947)
1890 – Conrad Richter, American journalist and novelist (d. 1968)
1891 – Irene Rich, American actress (d. 1988)
1893 – Kurt Reidemeister, German mathematician connected to the Vienna Circle (d. 1971)
1895 – Mike Gazella, American baseball player and manager (d. 1978)
1899 – Piero Dusio, Italian footballer, businessman and racing driver (d. 1975)
1900 – Gerald Marks, American composer (d. 1997)

1901–present
1902 – Arna Bontemps, American librarian, author, and poet (d. 1973)
  1902   – Karl Leichter, Estonian musicologist and academic (d. 1987)
1904 – Wilfred Pickles, English actor and radio host (d. 1978)
1905 – Yves Allégret, French director and screenwriter (d. 1987)
  1905   – John Rinehart Blue, American military officer, educator, businessperson, and politician (d. 1965)
  1905   – Coloman Braun-Bogdan, Romanian footballer and manager (d. 1983)
1909 – Herblock, American author and illustrator (d. 2001)
  1909   – Art Tatum, American jazz pianist (d. 1956)
1911 – Ashok Kumar, Indian film actor (d. 2001)
  1911   – Millosh Gjergj Nikolla, Albanian poet and author (d. 1938)
1912 – Cornel Wilde, Slovak-American actor, director, producer, and screenwriter (d. 1989)
1913 – Igor Torkar, Slovenian poet and playwright (d. 2004)
1915 – Terry Frost, English painter and academic (d. 2003)
1917 – George Osmond, American talent manager (d. 2007)
1918 – Robert Walker, American actor  (d. 1951)
1920 – Laraine Day, American actress (d. 2007)
1921 – Yves Montand, Italian-French actor and singer (d. 1991)
1922 – Nathaniel Clifton, American athlete (d. 1990)
  1922   – Gilberto Mendes, Brazilian composer (d. 2016)
1923 – John C. Champion, American screenwriter and producer (d. 1994)
  1923   – Rosemary Anne Sisson, English author and playwright (d. 2017)
  1923   – Faas Wilkes, Dutch footballer (d. 2006)
1924 – Terry Gibbs, American vibraphone player and bandleader
  1924   – Moturu Udayam, Indian activist and politician (d. 2002)
  1924   – Roberto Eduardo Viola, Argentinian general and politician, 44th President of Argentina (d. 1994)
1925 – Lenny Bruce, American comedian and actor (d. 1966)
  1925   – Armand Mouyal, Algerian-French fencer and police officer (d. 1988)
  1925   – Margaret Thatcher, English chemist and politician, Prime Minister of the United Kingdom (d. 2013)
  1925   – Gustav Winckler, Danish singer-songwriter (d. 1979)
1926 – Ray Brown, American bassist and cellist (d. 2002)
  1926   – Tommy Whittle, Scottish-English saxophonist (d. 2013)
  1926   – Killer Kowalski, American wrestler (d. 2008)
  1926   – Eddie Yost, American baseball player and coach (d. 2012)
1927 – Anita Kerr, American singer and arranger (d. 2022)
  1927   – Lee Konitz, American saxophonist and composer (d. 2020)
  1927   – Turgut Özal, Turkish engineer and politician, 8th President of Turkey (d. 1993)
1929 – Richard Howard, American poet, critic, and translator
  1929   – Walasse Ting, Chinese-American painter and poet (d. 2010)
1930 – Bruce Geller, American screenwriter and producer (d. 1978)
1931 – Raymond Kopa, French footballer (d. 2017)
  1931   – Eddie Mathews, American baseball player and manager (d. 2001)
1932 – Johnny Lytle, American vibraphone player and drummer (d. 1995)
  1932   – Liliane Montevecchi, French-Italian actress, dancer and singer (d. 2018)
1933 – Thomas Bingham, Baron Bingham of Cornhill, English lawyer and judge, Lord Chief Justice of England and Wales (d. 2012)
  1933   – Raynald Fréchette, Canadian lawyer, judge, and politician (d. 2007)
1934 – Nana Mouskouri, Greek singer and politician
1935 – Etterlene DeBarge, American singer-songwriter
  1935   – Bruce Morrow, American radio host and actor
1936 – Chitti Babu, Indian veena player and composer (d. 1996)
1938 – Shirley Caesar, American gospel singer-songwriter
  1938   – Hugo Young, English journalist and author (d. 2003)
1939 – Larry Bowie, American football player (d. 2012)
  1939   – Melinda Dillon, American actress (d. 2023)
1940 – Chris Farlowe, English rock, blues, and soul singer 
  1940   – Pharoah Sanders, American saxophonist and bandleader  (d. 2022)
1941 – Neil Aspinall, Welsh-English record producer and manager (d. 2008)
  1941   – Paul Simon, American singer-songwriter, guitarist, and producer 
  1941   – John Snow, English cricketer
1942 – Rutanya Alda, Latvian-American actress
  1942   – Bob Bailey, American baseball player and manager (d. 2018)
  1942   – Jerry Jones, American businessman
  1942   – Walter McGowan, Scottish boxer (d. 2016)
1943 – Peter Sauber, Swiss businessman, founded the Sauber F1 Team
1944 – Robert Lamm, American singer-songwriter, pianist, and producer 
1945 – Dési Bouterse, Surinamese general and politician, 9th President of Suriname
1946 – Levon Ananyan, Armenian journalist and author (d. 2013)
  1946   – Edwina Currie, English politician
  1946   – Lacy J. Dalton, American country music singer-songwriter and guitarist
1947 – Joe Dolce, American-Australian singer-songwriter and guitarist
  1947   – Sammy Hagar, American singer-songwriter, guitarist, and producer 
1948 – Nusrat Fateh Ali Khan, Pakistani musician (d. 1997)
1949 – Tom Mees, American sportscaster (d. 1996)
  1949   – Patrick Nève, Belgian racing driver (d. 2017)
1950 – Mollie Katzen, American chef and author
  1950   – Annegret Richter, German sprinter
  1950   – Simon Nicol, English singer-songwriter, guitarist, and producer 
1951 – Stephen Bayley, Welsh journalist, author, and critic
1952 – Mundo Earwood, American singer-songwriter and guitarist (d. 2014)
1953 – Pat Day, American jockey
1954 – George Frazier, American baseball player and sportscaster
  1954   – Claude Ribbe, French historian and academic
1955 – John Ferenzik, American keyboard player, guitarist, and composer
1956 – Joseph Toal, Scottish bishop
  1956   – Sinan Sakić, Serbian singer (d. 2018)
1957 – Reggie Theus, American basketball player and coach
1958 – Maria Cantwell, American lawyer and politician
  1958   – Jair-Rôhm Parker Wells, American bassist and composer 
1959 – Marie Osmond, American singer, actress, and television spokesperson 
1960 – Joey Belladonna, American singer-songwriter 
  1960   – Eric Joyce, Scottish soldier and politician
1961 – Rachel De Thame, English gardener and television presenter
  1961   – Doc Rivers, American basketball player and coach
1962 – T'Keyah Crystal Keymáh, American actress and author
  1962   – Kelly Preston, American actress (d. 2020)
  1962   – Jerry Rice, American football player
1963 – Colin Channer, Jamaican-American author and academic
  1963   – Chip Foose, American engineer and television host
1964 – Fanie de Villiers, South African cricketer
  1964   – Nie Haisheng, Chinese general, pilot, and astronaut
  1964   – Christopher Judge, American actor and producer
  1964   – Marco Travaglio, Italian journalist and author
1965 – Johan Museeuw, Belgian cyclist
1966 – Larry Collmus, American sportscaster
  1966   – John Regis, English sprinter
  1966   – Baja Mali Knindža, Serbian singer
1967 – Scott Cooper, American baseball player
  1967   – Trevor Hoffman, American baseball player
  1967   – Javier Sotomayor, Cuban high jumper
  1967   – Steve Vickers, English footballer
  1967   – Kate Walsh, American actress and producer
  1967   – Aleksander Čeferin, Slovenian lawyer and football administrator, 7th president of UEFA
1968 – Tisha Campbell-Martin, American actress and singer
1969 – Nancy Kerrigan, American figure skater and actress
  1969   – Cady McClain, American actress and singer
1970 – Serena Altschul, American journalist
  1970   – Rob Howley, Welsh rugby player and coach
  1970   – Paul Potts, English tenor
1971 – Sacha Baron Cohen, English comedian, actor, and screenwriter
  1971   – Billy Bush, American television journalist and radio host
  1971   – Pyrros Dimas, Albanian-Greek weightlifter and politician
1972 – Summer Sanders, American swimmer and sportscaster
1973 – Brian Dawkins, American football player and coach
  1973   – Matt Hughes, American wrestler and mixed martial artist
1977 – Gareth Batty, English cricketer
  1977   – Benjamin Clapp, American drummer 
  1977   – Antonio Di Natale, Italian footballer
  1977   – Justin Peroff, Canadian drummer and actor 
  1977   – Paul Pierce, American basketball player
1978 – Jermaine O'Neal, American basketball player
1979 – Wes Brown, English footballer
  1979   – Mamadou Niang, Senegalese footballer
1980 – Ashanti, American singer-songwriter, producer, and actress
  1980   – David Haye, English boxer
  1980   – Magne Hoseth, Norwegian footballer
  1980   – Scott Parker, English footballer
1981 – Taylor Buchholz, American baseball player
1982 – Antonio Pavanello, Italian rugby player
  1982   – Ian Thorpe, Australian swimmer
1986 – Gabriel Agbonlahor, English footballer
  1986   – Sergio Pérez Moya, Mexican footballer
1987 – Adrian Poparadu, Romanian footballer
1988 – Scott Jamieson, Australian footballer
1989 – Alexandria Ocasio-Cortez, American politician
  1989   – Clive Rose, Australian cricketer
  1989   – Brace Belden, American communist and trade union activist, volunteer in the People's Protection Units
1990 – Andrej Rendla, Slovak footballer
  1990   – Adrián Sardinero, Spanish footballer
1992 – Shelby Rogers, American tennis player
1993 – Tiffany Trump, daughter of 45th U.S. President Donald Trump
1994 – Ryan Matterson, Australian rugby league player
1995 – Jimin, South Korean singer
1996 – Joshua Wong, Hong Kong pro-democracy activist
1999 – Andrew Capobianco. American Olympic diver
2001 – Caleb McLaughlin, American actor

Deaths

Pre-1600
54 – Claudius, Roman emperor (b. 10 BC)
 807 – Simpert, bishop of Augsburg
 982 – Jing Zong, emperor of the Liao Dynasty (b. 948)
1093 – Robert I, count of Flanders (b. 1035)
1100 – Guy I, count of Ponthieu
1195 – Gualdim Pais, Portuguese crusader (b. 1118)
1282 – Nichiren, Japanese Buddhist priest (b. 1222)
1382 – Peter II, king of Cyprus
1415 – Thomas FitzAlan, 12th Earl of Arundel, English politician, Lord High Treasurer of England (b. 1381)
1435 – Hermann II, count of Croatia
1562 – Claudin de Sermisy, French composer (b. 1495)

1601–1900
1605 – Theodore Beza, French theologian and scholar (b. 1519)
1673 – Christoffer Gabel, German-Danish accountant and politician (b. 1617)
1687 – Geminiano Montanari, Italian astronomer and lens maker (b. 1633)
1694 – Samuel von Pufendorf, German historian, economist, and jurist (b. 1632)
1706 – Iyasu I, emperor of Ethiopia (b. 1654)
1715 – Nicolas Malebranche, French priest and philosopher (b. 1638)
1759 – John Henley, English clergyman and author (b. 1692)
1788 – Robert Nugent, 1st Earl Nugent, Irish poet and politician (b. 1702)
1812 – Isaac Brock, English general and politician, Lieutenant Governor of Upper Canada (b. 1769)
1815 – Joachim Murat, French general (b. 1767)
1822 – Antonio Canova, Italian sculptor (b. 1757)
1825 – Maximilian I Joseph, king of Bavaria (b. 1756)
1841 – Patrick Campbell, Scottish admiral (b. 1773)
1869 – Charles Augustin Sainte-Beuve, French poet, author, and critic (b. 1804)
1882 – Arthur de Gobineau, French philosopher and author (b. 1816)
1890 – Samuel Freeman Miller, American lawyer and jurist (b. 1816)

1901–present
1904 – Pavlos Melas, French-Greek captain (b. 1870)
1905 – Henry Irving, English actor and manager (b. 1838)
1909 – Francesc Ferrer i Guàrdia, Spanish philosopher and academic (b. 1849)
1911 – Sister Nivedita, Irish-Indian social worker, author, and educator (b. 1867)
1917 – Florence La Badie, American actress (b. 1888)
1919 – Karl Adolph Gjellerup, Danish author and poet, Nobel Prize laureate (b. 1857)
1926 – Hans E. Kinck, Norwegian philologist and author (b. 1865)
1930 – T. Alexander Harrison, American painter and educator (b. 1853)
1931 – Ernst Didring, Swedish author (b. 1868)
1938 – E. C. Segar, American cartoonist, created Popeye (b. 1894)
1945 – Milton S. Hershey, American businessman, founded The Hershey Company (b. 1857)
1950 – Ernest Haycox, American soldier and author (b. 1899)
1955 – Manuel Ávila Camacho, Mexican general and politician, 45th President of Mexico (b. 1897)
1956 – Cahit Sıtkı Tarancı, Turkish poet and author (b. 1910)
1961 – Prince Louis Rwagasore, Burundi politician, Prime Minister of Burundi (b. 1932)
1966 – Clifton Webb, American actor and dancer (b. 1889)
1968 – Bea Benaderet, American actress and voice artist (b. 1906)
1973 – Cevat Şakir Kabaağaçlı, Turkish ethnographer and author (b. 1886)
  1973   – Albert Mandler, Austrian-Israeli general (b. 1929)
1974 – Otto Binder, American author (b. 1911)
  1974   – Anatoli Kozhemyakin, Soviet footballer (b. 1953)
  1974   – Ed Sullivan, American journalist and talk show host (b. 1901)
1979 – Antonio Berni, Argentinian painter, illustrator, and engraver (b. 1905)
1981 – Rebecca Clarke, English viola player and composer (b. 1886)
1985 – Tage Danielsson, Swedish author, actor, and director (b. 1928)
1987 – Walter Houser Brattain, American physicist and engineer, Nobel Prize laureate (b. 1902)
  1987   – Kishore Kumar, Indian singer-songwriter, producer, actor, and director (b. 1929)
  1987   – Nilgün Marmara, Turkish poet and author (b. 1958)
1990 – Hans Namuth, German-American photographer (b. 1915)
  1990   – Lê Đức Thọ, Vietnamese general and politician, Nobel Prize laureate (b. 1911)
1992 – James Marshall, American author and illustrator (b. 1942)
1993 – Otmar Gutmann, German filmmaker (b. 1937)
1996 – Beryl Reid, English actress (b. 1919)
1998 – Dmitry Nikolayevich Filippov, Russian businessman and politician (b. 1944)
1999 – Michael Hartnett, Irish poet (b. 1941)
2000 – Jean Peters, American actress (b. 1926)
2001 – Peter Doyle, Australian singer-songwriter (b. 1949)
2002 – Stephen Ambrose, American historian and author (b. 1936)
  2002   – Keene Curtis, American actor (b. 1923)
2003 – Bertram Brockhouse, Canadian physicist and academic, Nobel Prize laureate (b. 1918)
2004 – Enrique Fernando, Filipino lawyer and jurist, 13th Chief Justice of the Supreme Court of the Philippines (b. 1915)
  2004   – Bernice Rubens, Welsh author (b. 1928)
2005 – Vivian Malone Jones, American activist (b. 1942)
2006 – Wang Guangmei, Chinese philanthropist and politician, 2nd Spouse of the President of the People's Republic of China (b. 1921)
2007 – Bob Denard, French soldier and academic (b. 1929)
2008 – Alexei Cherepanov, Russian ice hockey player (b. 1989)
2009 – Stephen Barnett, American scholar and academic (b. 1935)
2010 – Vernon Biever, American photographer (b. 1923)
2011 – Barbara Kent, Canadian-born American actress (b. 1907)
2012 – Stuart Bell, English lawyer and politician (b. 1938)
  2012   – Gary Collins, American actor (b. 1938)
  2012   – Tomonobu Imamichi, Japanese philosopher and academic (b. 1922)
2013 – Martin Drewes, German soldier and pilot (b. 1918)
  2013   – Joe Meriweather, American basketball player and coach (b. 1953)
  2013   – Tommy Whittle, Scottish-English saxophonist (b. 1926)
  2013   – Takashi Yanase, Japanese poet and illustrator, created Anpanman (b. 1919)
2014 – John Bradfield, English biologist and businessman, founded Cambridge Science Park (b. 1925)
  2014   – Antonio Cafiero, Argentinian accountant and politician, Governor of Buenos Aires Province (b. 1922)
  2014   – Margaret Hillert, American author and poet (b. 1920)
  2014   – Mohammad Sarengat, Indonesian sprinter (b. 1939)
  2014   – Pontus Segerström, Swedish footballer (b. 1981)
2015 – Rosalyn Baxandall, American historian, author, and academic (b. 1939)
  2015   – Bruce Hyde, American academic and actor (b. 1941)
  2015   – Michael J. H. Walsh, English general (b. 1927)
2016 – Bhumibol Adulyadej (Rama IX), King of Thailand (b. 1927)
  2016   – Dario Fo, Italian playwright, actor, director, and composer Nobel Prize laureate (b. 1926)
  2016   – Jim Prentice, Canadian lawyer and politician, 16th Premier of Alberta (b. 1956)
2017 – Albert Zafy, Malagasy politician (b. 1927)
2018 – Annapurna Devi, Indian surbahar (bass sitar) player (b. 1927)

Holidays and observances
Azerbaijani Railway Day (Azerbaijan)
Christian feast day:
Blessed Alexandrina of Balasar
Daniel and companions, of Ceuta
Edward the Confessor (translation)
Gerald of Aurillac
Blessed Maddalena Panattieri (OP)
Theophilus of Antioch
October 13 (Eastern Orthodox liturgics)
Doi taikomatsuri October 13–15 (Shikokuchūō, Ehime, Japan)
International Day for Disaster Risk Reduction (international)
Paramedics' Day (Poland)
Rwagasore Day (Burundi)

References

External links

 
 
 

Days of the year
October